Oppo VOOC (Voltage Open Loop Multi-step Constant-Current Charging), also known as a Warp Charge or SUPERVOOC on OnePlus devices and Dart Charge on Realme devices, is a proprietary rapid-charge technology created by BBK Electronics. In contrast to the USB Power Delivery and Qualcomm Quick Charge technology, which increases the voltage during fast charging, VOOC uses a higher current than standard USB charging. The VOOC Flash Charge circuit technology reportedly lowers the temperature of the charging adapter, and creates an interface from the adapter to the phone, which, OPPO claims, improves the speed and safety of the charge.

VOOC 2.0 has been licensed to OnePlus as the Dash Charge technology. A single-cell, 30-watt (5 V/6 A) version of VOOC 4.0 has also been licensed to OnePlus as Warp Charge. OnePlus does not market its phones as VOOC-compatible despite the fact that VOOC 2.0 and Dash is compatible. 

, VOOC has been licensed to 14 other corporations, most of which are in the phone charging and power strip industries. Oppo claims that more than 1000 patents around VOOC have been filed worldwide.

Versions 
, VOOC / SuperVOOC comes in a few variations:
 VOOC 2.0 (2015), same as the first version that was introduced in 2014, which operates at 5 V/4 A.
 VOOC 3.0 (2019), a technology that claims to be 23.8% faster than VOOC and "based on a new technology". It appears to be a 5 V/5 A version of VOOC. which can charge the phone up to 55% in 30 minutes.
 SuperVOOC (2018), a successor of VOOC 2.0 with 10 V/5 A (50W). It charges a two-cell battery in series.
 VOOC 4.0 (2019 Sep), a successor of VOOC 3.0, which operates at 5 V/6 A (30W). Can charge the phone up to 67% in 30 minutes.
 SuperVOOC 2.0 (2020 Jul), operating at 20 V/6.25 A (125W) max. The phone uses three charge pump in parallel to handle such powers. Also released was a lower-power 10 V/5 A (50W) GaN charger, focusing on small size instead.
 At MWC 2022, Oppo showed off two upcoming variants of VOOC, the first is 150W SuperVOOC (20V at 7.5A), which can charge a 4,500mAh battery to 50% in 5 minutes or 100% in 15 minutes. The other VOOC variant is "240W SUPERVOOC Flash Charge" (24V at 10A) that can fully charge a battery to 100% in 8 minutes 9 seconds or 50% in 3 minutes 24 seconds.

Devices 

 VOOC 2.0 is supported by OPPO R6 through Oppo R15, by F1 (Find 1) Plus through Find X, Realme 3 Pro, Realme XT, Realme X,  and Oppo N3.
 OnePlus devices since OnePlus 3 (3, 3T, 5, 5T, 6, 6T, 7) support Dash Charge, claiming to charge "a day's power in half an hour".
 VOOC 3.0 is supported by Oppo F11, Oppo Reno series, Realme 5 Pro, Oppo F-15 .
 SuperVOOC is supported by the Oppo Find X, OPPO R17 Pro, Realme 7 Pro and Realme X2 Pro.
 VOOC 4.0 is supported by Realme 6, Realme 7,Realme 8 and Realme X3 series.
 Warp Charge is supported by the OnePlus 6T McLaren, 7 Pro and 7T series and OnePlus 8 series.
 SuperVOOC 2.0 (2020) is supported by OPPO Find X2, OPPO Find X3, OPPO Reno 4 Pro, Realme 7 Pro, Realme 8 Pro, Reno 5, Reno 5 Pro, Realme GT Master Edition, Realme GT 2 &GT 2 Pro
 New warp charge 65 is supported by Oneplus 8T, OnePlus 9 and OnePlus 9 Pro.
 150W VOOC is supported by Realme GT NEO 3
All models reported include the "s" (or OnePlus "T"), "Plus", and "Pro" variants.

Oppo's mobile DAC, Oppo HA-2SE, also features VOOC charging.

Technology 
All versions of VOOC require a proprietary cable to work. In addition to electrical requirements like the thickness (low electrical resistance) to handle the high currents without overheating, the VOOC 2.0/Dash protocol requires a fifth pin on the (USB-A to USB-C) cable to communicate through. Without such communication, the charger runs at a limit of 5 V/1.5 A. From VOOC 4.0 this limit elevated to 5V/2.0A. With the even higher power of SuperVOOC 2.0, the cable itself is authenticated with a cryptographic E-marker for safety.

On the Android phone end, the VOOC communication code is open source under GNU General Public License (GNU GPL) version 2 as a part of the modified Linux kernel, and has been used by custom ROMs like Lineage OS. The firmware code for PIC16F microcontrollers on the "VOOC IC" is also defined in the code. Documentation provided by OnePlus mentions a BQ27541 battery gauge chip made by Texas Instruments, with Dash-specific protocol extensions.  The source code allows a list of parts used for the technology to be made: for example, the Find X uses a pic1508/stm8s chip on the adapter and a bq25882 two-cell charger chip on the phone. The BQ27541 gauge is exchanged for a BQ28Z610 gauge which can handle two-cell battery packs.

Marketing 

OnePlus has recognised the weakness of many other mobile phones with fast charging technology to significantly slow down the charging speed during operation of the device, using it as an opportunity to promote Dash Charge enabled devices, which do not throttle the input power during operation.

Other charging technologies 

 USB-PD and PPS
 Qualcomm's Quick Charge
 Mediatek's Pump Express
 Huawei's SuperCharge

References

Battery charging
Chinese inventions